Itching Palms is a 1923 American silent comedy horror film directed by James W. Horne and starring Tom Gallery, Herschel Mayall and Virginia Fox.

Cast
 Tom Gallery as Jerry
 Herschel Mayall as Jerry's Father
 Virginia Fox as 	Virgie
 Tom Wilson as Mac
 Joseph Harrington as Obadiah Simpkins
 Victor Potel as The Village Dumbbell
 Gertrude Claire as Grandma Gano
 Robert Walker as 	Dr. Peak
 Thomas G. Lingham as Judge Barrett 
 Richard Cummings as Constable Coman

References

Bibliography
 Connelly, Robert B. The Silents: Silent Feature Films, 1910-36, Volume 40, Issue 2. December Press, 1998.
 Munden, Kenneth White. The American Film Institute Catalog of Motion Pictures Produced in the United States, Part 1. University of California Press, 1997.

External links
 

1923 films
1920s comedy horror films
1923 comedy films
1920s English-language films
American silent feature films
American comedy horror films
American black-and-white films
Film Booking Offices of America films
Films directed by James W. Horne
1920s American films
Silent comedy-drama films
Silent horror films
Silent American drama films
Silent American comedy films